Colobothea scolopacea is a species of beetle in the family Cerambycidae. It was described by Wilhelm Ferdinand Erichson in 1847. It is known from Peru.

References

scolopacea
Beetles described in 1847